The 1964 CONMEBOL Pre-Olympic Tournament took place during May and June 1964. It was the 2nd CONMEBOL Pre-Olympic Tournament.

Bolivia, Paraguay and Venezuela did not participate. Argentina and Brazil qualified for the 1964 Summer Olympics.

It is estimated that 328 people died in a stampede during the match between Argentina and Peru on 24 May 1964.

Group stage

Playoff

Brazil qualified for 1964 Summer Olympics.

References 

CONMEBOL Pre-Olympic Tournament
1964 in association football